The Bureau of Labor Statistics (BLS) is a unit of the United States Department of Labor. It is the principal fact-finding agency for the U.S. government in the broad field of  labor economics and statistics and serves as a principal agency of the U.S. Federal Statistical System.  The BLS collects, processes, analyzes, and disseminates essential statistical data to the American public, the U.S. Congress, other Federal agencies, State and local governments, business, and labor representatives. The BLS also serves as a statistical resource to the United States Department of Labor, and conducts research measuring the income levels families need to maintain a satisfactory quality of life.

BLS data must satisfy a number of criteria, including relevance to current social and economic issues, timeliness in reflecting today's rapidly changing economic conditions, accuracy and consistently high statistical quality, impartiality in both subject matter and presentation, and accessibility to all.  To avoid the appearance of partiality, the dates of major data releases are scheduled more than a year in advance, in coordination with the Office of Management and Budget.

History

The Bureau of Labor was established within the Department of the Interior on June 27, 1884, to collect information about employment and labor. Its creation under the Bureau of Labor Act (23 Stat. 60) stemmed from the findings of U.S. Senator Henry W. Blair's "Labor and Capital Hearings," which examined labor issues and working conditions in the U.S. Statistician Carroll D. Wright became the first U.S. Commissioner of Labor in 1885, a position he held until 1905. The Bureau's placement within the federal government structure changed three times in the first 29 years following its formation. It was made an independent (sub-Cabinet) department by the Department of Labor Act (25 Stat. 182) on June 13, 1888. The Bureau was then incorporated into the Department of Commerce and Labor by the Department of Commerce Act (32 Stat. 827) on February 14, 1903. Finally, it was transferred under the Department of Labor in 1913 where it resides today. The BLS is now headquartered in the Postal Square Building near the United States Capitol and Union Station.

Since 1915, the BLS has published the Monthly Labor Review, a journal focused on the data and methodologies of labor statistics.

The BLS is headed by a commissioner who serves a four-year term from the date he or she takes office. The most recent Commissioner of Labor Statistics is William W. Beach, who was assumed office on March 28, 2019  Dr. William Beach was confirmed by the United States Senate on March 13, 2019. William Beach's Senate Confirmation. 

Erica Groshen, who was confirmed by the U.S. Senate on January 2, 2013 and sworn in as the 14th Commissioner of Labor Statistics on January 29, 2013, for a term that ended on January 27, 2017.  William Wiatrowski, Deputy Commissioner of the BLS, was serving as Acting Commissioner until the next commissioner, William Beach was sworn in.

Commissioners

Commissioners of Labor Statistics (1885 to present):

Statistical reporting
Statistics published by the BLS fall into four main categories:

Prices 
 U.S. Consumer Price Index
 Producer Price Index
 U.S. Import and Export Price Indices
 Consumer Expenditure Survey

Employment and unemployment 

 Current Population Survey (The "Household Survey")
 The American Time Use Survey
 Current Employment Statistics (The "Establishment Survey")
 Payroll Employment
 JOLTS report - Job Openings and Labor Turnover Survey
 Economic geography
 Salary Data
 Local Area Unemployment Statistics (LAUS)
 List of U.S. states by unemployment rate
 Current Employment Statistics State and Area program
 The Job Openings and Labor Turnover Survey (JOLTS)
 The Quarterly Census of Employment and Wages (QCEW)
 The Business Employment Dynamics (BED) program
 Ten year occupational employment projections
 Occupational Employment and Wage Statistics, called OES until recently
 Mass Layoff Statistics--discontinued in 2013

Compensation and working conditions 
 National Compensation Survey
 Employment Cost Index
 Workplace Injury and Fatality Statistics

Productivity 
 Labor productivity, aggregate and by industry
 Multifactor productivity
 State labor productivity

Statistical regions
Data produced by the BLS is often categorized into groups of states known as Census Regions.  There are four Census Regions, which are further categorized by Census Division as follows:

Northeast Region
 New England Division: Connecticut, Maine, Massachusetts, New Hampshire, Rhode Island, and Vermont.
 Middle Atlantic Division: New Jersey, New York, and Pennsylvania.
South Region
 South Atlantic Division: Delaware, District of Columbia, Florida, Georgia, Maryland, North Carolina, South Carolina, Virginia, and West Virginia.
 East South Central Division: Alabama, Kentucky, Mississippi, and Tennessee.
 West South Central Division: Arkansas, Louisiana, Oklahoma, and Texas.
Midwest Region
 East North Central Division: Illinois, Indiana, Michigan, Ohio, and Wisconsin.
 West North Central Division: Iowa, Kansas, Minnesota, Missouri, Nebraska, North Dakota, and South Dakota.
West Region
 Mountain Division: Arizona, Colorado, Idaho, Montana, Nevada, New Mexico, Utah, and Wyoming.
 Pacific Division: Alaska, California, Hawaii, Oregon, and Washington.

See also

 Alternative employment arrangements
 Bureau of Economic Analysis
 Career Guide to Industries
 Data.gov
 Economic reports
 Index of Leading Indicators
 Job Creation Index
 Monthly Labor Review
 National Income and Product Accounts
 Occupational Outlook Handbook
 U.S. Census Bureau
 USAFacts

Footnotes

Further reading
 Joseph P. Goldberg and William T. Moye, The First 100 Years of the Bureau of Labor Statistics. Bulletin No. 2235. Washington, D.C.: U.S. Government Printing Office, 1985.
 William J. Wiatrowski, "BLS at 125: Using historic principles to track the 21st-century economy". Monthly Labor Review, June 2009, pp. 3–25.

External links

 
 Records of the Bureau of Labor Statistics in the National Archives (Record Group 257)
 Bureau of Labor Statistics in the Federal Register
 Publications of the BLS available on FRASER
 Bulletins of the United States Bureau of Labor Statistics, dating back to 1895
 Local Area Unemployment Reports

 
1884 establishments in the United States
Federal Statistical System of the United States
National statistical services
Official statistics
Statistical organizations in the United States
Unemployment in the United States